Challengers FC is a Saint Lucian football club based in Soufrière, competing in the Saint Lucia Gold Division, the top tier of Saint Lucian football.

References

Challengers FC